Eucrosia is a genus of herbaceous, perennial and bulbous plants in the Amaryllis family (Amaryllidaceae, subfamily Amaryllidoideae) distributed from Ecuador to Peru. The genus contains eight species. Phaedranassa and Rauhia are the genera most closely related to Eucrosia.

Description
All the members of the genus are bulbous. The leaves are deciduous, with characteristic long petioles and elliptical or ovate blades (laminae), up to 25 cm wide; they may or may not be present when the flowers are produced. The inflorescence is an umbel of 6–30 weakly to strongly zygomorphic flowers, tubular at the base, green, yellow or red in colour. The stamens hang downwards (i.e. are declinate) and have long filaments which in most species form a cup containing nectaries at the base. The flowers are assumed to be adapted for butterfly pollination, although there is one report of a hummingbird visiting E. eucrosioides. The fruit is a capsule with three locules; the seeds are flattened and winged. The diploid chromosome number is most commonly 2n=46.

Species
, the World Checklist of Selected Plant Families accepted seven species of Eucrosia:

Eucrosia aurantiaca (Baker) Traub – Southern central Ecuador
Eucrosia bicolor Ker Gawl. – Ecuador to Peru
Eucrosia calendulina Meerow & Sagást. – Peru
Eucrosia dodsonii Meerow & Dehgan – Ecuador
Eucrosia eucrosioides (Herb.) Pax – South western Ecuador to Northern Peru
Eucrosia mirabilis (Baker) Traub – Peru, Ecuador
Eucrosia stricklandii (Baker) Meerow – Ecuador

A formerly accepted species has been moved to the genus Stenomesson:
Eucrosia tubiflora Meerow = Stenomesson tubiflorum (Meerow) Meerow

Distribution and habitat

Eucrosia is restricted to the central Andes of Ecuador and Peru. All of the species are found only in small areas or as small numbers of individuals. Three species are endemic to Ecuador, two to Peru. Three further species are only occasionally found in Peru, being primarily distributed in Ecuador. All but one species of Eucrosia are adapted to seasonally dry habitats, found on the lower, Pacific-facing slopes of the Andes and the adjacent lowlands. The exception is E. dodsonii, which grows in the understory of montane rainforest.

Cultivation
In cultivation, all species except the rainforest dweller E. dobsonii can be grown in pots in gritty soil in good light, being kept warm and dry when the leaves wither, and watered when the flowers or leaves begin to grow again. E. dobsonii needs shadier conditions and a more open growing medium. Only E. bicolor is widely grown.

References

Bibliography

External links
 Images of Eucrosia species from The International Bulb Society website

 
Amaryllidaceae genera
Taxonomy articles created by Polbot